Adam Frost may refer to:

Adam Frost (writer)
Adam Frost (garden designer)
Adam Frost, character in the TV series The Leftovers
Adam Frost (wheelchair rugby), Wheelchair rugby at the 2008 Summer Paralympics – Rosters
Adam Frost (actor) in The Sausage Factory